is a retired Japanese TV journalist and professor at Kyoto University of Art and Design. In December 1990, he spent seven days aboard the Mir space station. He became the first person of Japanese nationality to fly in space, and his space mission was the second spaceflight to be commercially sponsored and funded. Akiyama was also the first civilian to use commercial space flight, and the first journalist to report from outer space.

Education and career

Akiyama attended and earned his bachelor's degree at the International Christian University located in Mitaka, Tokyo. He then joined the Tokyo Broadcasting System (TBS) as a journalist in 1966. He worked for the BBC World Service from 1967–1971 before becoming a correspondent for the TBS Division of Foreign News. From 1984 to 1988, he served as TBS chief correspondent in Washington D.C.

Space training
On 17 August 1989, Akiyama was selected for a commercial Soviet-Japanese flight. The flight was sponsored by the TBS Corporation to celebrate its fortieth anniversary. The amount that the corporation paid for the flight of its employee differs significantly from one source to another (28 million US dollars, 25 million, 5 billion yen or 37 million US dollars). Akiyama started training at the Yuri Gagarin Cosmonaut Training Center in October 1989.

Spaceflight

TBS wanted to send the first Japanese to space in order to boost their TV ratings. 163 TBS employees applied for the opportunity to fly to space. Eventually, Akiyama and camerawoman Ryoko Kikuchi were selected as the two final candidates. When Kikuchi developed a case of appendicitis a week before launch, Akiyama was selected for cosmonaut training and he was the primary crew member, with no backup in place. Akiyama began cosmonaut training in August 1989 in a deal between TBS and the Soviet Union. The commercialization of space flight was evident by the Soyuz TM-11 covered with advertising of TBS and other Japanese companies.

After successfully completing a Research Cosmonaut training course at the Yuri Gagarin Cosmonaut Training Center in present-day Russia, Akiyama launched aboard the Soyuz TM-11 mission to the Mir space station on 2 December 1990 along with mission commander Viktor Afanasyev and flight engineer Musa Manarov. During his time aboard Mir, Akiyama gave live reports each day documenting life aboard the station. He returned just over a week later aboard Soyuz TM-10 along with Gennadi Manakov and Gennadi Strekalov on 10 December. Akiyama's mission marked the first flight of a person of Japanese nationality in space as well as the first commercially sponsored and funded spaceflight of an individual in history. Akiyama was also the first journalist to give live reports from space.

The company reportedly lost  on the deal.

TV reports
Akiyama broke stereotypes since he was not an athletic trained astronaut, scientist nor engineer. Thus Akiyama was called the first antihero in space for being just an ordinary civilian. As a TV reporter, Akiyama made comments during his nightly live broadcasts in the Mir:

The first words of Akiyama seconds after the Soyuz TM-11 reached orbit were:

Studying the frogs' behavior in the zero-g environment was an experiment for Japanese schoolchildren.

During training he quit smoking four-pack-a-day cigarettes. Before liftoff when asked what he looked forward to most upon his return to Earth he said:

Akiyama described his struggles such as space sickness, need for cigarettes, his brain was "floating around in my head" and "I wish I had brought along some natto,". Meanwhile Akiyama worried that his 2 children spent too much time watching TV. During a radio broadcast he said "Please tell Ken-ken and Naoko to study,". His wife Kyoko answered "The children are doing fine," "Please try to relax." Initially the TBS TV viewership was high, but by midweek it declined to a bit above normal.

Later career 
Akiyama returned to TBS after completing his spaceflight and became deputy director of the TBS News Division. He retired from TBS in 1995, because he disagreed with the active commercialization of television.

In April 1991, he shot a film, with a group of Japanese journalists, about the state of the Aral Sea in Kazakhstan.

From January 1996, he engaged in organic farming with rice and mushrooms in the Abukuma mountains in the town Takine, near Tamura, Fukushima, Fukushima Prefecture. He also wrote books and give lectures focusing on environmental issues. In March 2011, he was personally affected by the Fukushima disaster and was forced to abandon his farm.

On 1 November 2011, he became a professor of agriculture at the Faculty of Arts, Kyoto University of Art and Design.

Personal life
Akiyama was married to Kyoko Akiyama, and the couple had a son and a daughter. He left his family in Tokyo to go farm. They divorced in 1995 due to his plans for organic farming in Fukushima Prefecture. He was forced off his farm due to the Fukushima Daiichi nuclear disaster in 2011. Akiyama moved to Kyoto to teach after losing his farm in Fukushima.

Awards and decorations 
Akiyama received multiple awards and decorations, including:

 1990 Order of Friendship of Peoples (10 December 1990, Soviet Union) - "for the successful implementation of space flight on the orbital research complex "Mir""
 1991 Tokyo Metropolitan Cultural Honor award.
 2000 Japanese Society for Biological Sciences in Space Achievement Award.
 2011 Medal "For Merit in Space Exploration" (12 April 2011, Russia) - "for a great contribution to the development of international cooperation in the field of manned space exploration"

Publications
He made reports in Japanese, which were published later, dedicated to his space flight. He also co-authored articles on the development of space tourism and farming.

 The Pleasure of Spaceflight, Journal of Space Technology and Science - Vol.9 No.1'93.
 Journey around agriculture - 1 Mar 1998
 Japanese astronaut official photographic record collection (1991) 
 Farmer's Diary (1998) 
 Space, 1 Aug 1992
 Space (above) (Bungei Bunko) 1 Aug 1995
 Space (below) (Bungei Bunko) 1 Aug 1995
 To living with agriculture - earth and space (1999) 
 Space Specialist 9 Days-First Japanese Astronaut Experience All Records 1 Feb 1991
 This is a space correspondent! -I went to space! 1 Feb 1991
 Hoe and Spacecraft 30 Nov 2007

See also 
 
 
 Mamoru Mohri – first astronaut of an official Japanese space agency

References

External links
Spacefacts biography of Toyohiro Akiyama

1942 births
Japanese astronauts
Living people
Japanese television journalists
International Christian University alumni
Mir crew members